This is a list of cathedrals in the British Overseas Territory of Bermuda.

The Cathedral of the Most Holy Trinity, of the Anglican Church of Bermuda.
The Cathedral of Saint Theresa of Lisieux, of the Roman Catholic Church.

References

Bermuda
Lists of religious buildings and structures in British Overseas Territories
Cathedrals
Cathedrals